is a municipality in Innlandet county, Norway. It is located in the traditional district of Toten. The administrative centre of the municipality is town of Gjøvik. Some of the villages in Gjøvik include Biri, Bybrua, and Hunndalen.

The  municipality is the 169th largest by area out of the 356 municipalities in Norway. Gjøvik is the 35th most populous municipality in Norway with a population of 30,267.

General information
Historically, the village of Gjøvik was part of the parish and municipality of Vardal. On 1 January 1861, the village was granted kjøpstad (town) status. At that time, the village was separated from Vardal to form a separate municipality given its new status as a town. Initially, the new town and municipality of Gjøvik had 626 residents. On 1 July 1921, a part of Vardal municipality located just outside the town of Gjøvik (population: 723) was annexed into the town. Again, on 1 January 1955, another part of Vardal (population: 1,372) was transferred to the town. During the 1960s, there were many municipal mergers across Norway due to the work of the Schei Committee. On 1 January 1964, the neighboring rural municipalities of Biri (population: 3,274), Snertingdal (population: 2,471), and most of Vardal (population: 9,612) were all merged with the town of Gjøvik (population: 8,251) to form the new, larger Gjøvik Municipality.

Etymology
The town and municipality is named after the old Gjøvik farm. The first element is djúpr which means "deep" and the second element is vík which means "inlet".

Coat of arms
The coat of arms was granted on 2 September 1960. The official blazon is "On an azure background, an argent swimming swan". This means the arms have a blue field (background) and the charge is a dexter swan (Cygnus cygnus) with a naiant attitude. The swan has a tincture of argent which means it is colored white most of the time, but if it is made out of metal, then silver is used. The swan is a symbol for the side-wheel steamer Skiblander, often called the "white swan of Mjøsa", which is usually docked in the town harbor.

The former coat of arms from 1922-1960 was a linden tree, with the statement Vis et voluntas (meaning "Force and will") on the lower part of the shield. The following design was a so-called "potpourri" vase, the most significant design of the glassworks that was the funding industry of the town.

Churches

The Church of Norway has seven parishes within the municipality of Gjøvik. It is part of the Toten prosti (deanery) in the Diocese of Hamar.

Gjøvik Church is the main church for the municipality. It was designed by architect Jacob Wilhelm Nordan. The wooden structure was built between 1881-82. Both the church buildings and fixtures are designed in Gothic Revival architecture. The exterior of the church has contrasting colors on wall surfaces and bearing structures. The altarpiece  was painted by artist, Asta Nørregaard. The churchyard has a monument dedicated to the memory of Lutheran missionary, Paul Olaf Bodding. The church was restored during 1927, 1960, 2004-2005 and in 2009.

Geography

Along with Hamar, Lillehammer, Brumunddal, and Moelv, Gjøvik is one of the many towns bordering Norway's biggest lake, Mjøsa. The town administration of Gjøvik also includes the suburb area Hunndalen and the rural districts of Biri, Snertingdal, and Vardal.

Gjøvik is bordered on the north by Lillehammer Municipality, in the south by Østre Toten Municipality and Vestre Toten Municipality, and in the west by Søndre Land Municipality and Nordre Land Municipality. Across Lake Mjøsa to the east lies Ringsaker Municipality.

Economy
Gjøvik owes much of its early growth to the local glassworks, which were established there by Caspar Kauffeldt in 1807. In the early 19th century, there was considerable immigration there from Valdres and Western Norway, aiding Gjøvik's growth. The village of Gjøvik was granted kjøpstad status in 1861, making it a town and self-governing municipality. Later, O. Mustad & Son became one of the world's largest manufacturers of fish hooks.

Today Hoff Potetindustrier, Hunton Fiber, and Natre Vinduer are some of the industrial companies operating from Gjøvik. The town is also a port for the former traffic ship, Skibladner, which is now a tourist ship.

The local paper is the Oppland Arbeiderblad. It was formerly a Labour Party newspaper. Defunct newspapers include Oplændingen and Velgeren (Labour Democrat/Liberal), Samhold (Liberal, later Agrarian) and Ny Dag (Communist).

Gjøvik has two notable hotels, the Grand hotel and the Strand hotel.

There have been three notable concerts held in Gjøvik's history, which starred Toto, Robbie Williams and Bryan Adams (June 2011).

Government
All municipalities in Norway, including Gjøvik, are responsible for primary education (through 10th grade), outpatient health services, senior citizen services, welfare and other social services, zoning, economic development, and municipal roads and utilities. The municipality is governed by a municipal council of elected representatives, which in turn elect a mayor.

Municipal council
The municipal council  of Gjøvik is made up of representatives that are elected to four year terms. X|The party breakdown of the municipal council is as follows:

Mayors
The mayors of Gjøvik:

1861–1872: Adolph Martin Lund 	
1873-1873: Peter Soelberg 	
1874-1874: Martin Opsahl 	
1875–1879: Adolph Martin Lund 	
1879–1884: Haagen Skattum (H)
1885–1888: Mathias Wildaasen (V)
1889-1889: Hans O. Eger (V)
1890-1890: Andreas Slettum 	
1891–1893: Fredrik Fischer (H)
1894-1894: Christian Nygaard (V)
1895–1896: Anders Østbye (V)
1897-1898: Fredrik Fischer (H)
1898–1899: Anders Østbye (V)
1900-1900: Fredrik Fischer (H)
1901-1901: Anders Østbye (V)
1902–1904: Alf Mjøen (V)
1905-1905: Fredrik Fischer (H)
1906-1906: Adolf Houg (V)
1907-1907: Fredrik Fischer (H)
1908-1908: Leif Castberg (AD)
1909-1909: Adolf Skattum (H)
1910–1916: Leif Castberg (AD)
1917–1922: Johan Granvin (H)
1923–1941: Niels Ødegaard (Ap)
1941–1945: John Lærum (NS)
1945–1967: Niels Ødegaard (Ap)
1968–1978: Nils Røstadstuen (Ap)
1978–1981: Alf Iversen (Ap)
1982–1991: Martin Stikbakke (Ap)
1992–2000: Tore Hagebakken (Ap)
2000–2001: Kåre Haugen (Ap)
2001–2005: Tore Hagebakken (Ap)
2005–2007: Kåre Haugen (Ap)
2007–2019: Bjørn Iddberg (Ap)
2019–present: Torvild Sveen (Sp)

Attractions
 The world’s largest arena excavated in rock, called Gjøvik Olympic Hall, is located in Gjøvik. It was one of the sites of the Lillehammer Winter Olympics ice hockey games in 1994.
 Gjøvik farm
 Gjøvik glassworks
 Eiktunet cultural-history museum
 The world's oldest paddle steamer still on a regular schedule, the PS Skibladner
 Biri Travbane

Notable people

Public Service & public thinking 
 Anders Lysgaard (1756–1827) farmer and rep. at the Norwegian Constituent Assembly
 Hans Schikkelstad (1789–1843) farmer and politician; founded O. Mustad & Søn
 Balthazar Mathias Keilhau (1797–1858) a Norwegian geologist and mountain pioneer
 Hans Mustad (1837–1918) Norwegian businessperson, shaped the company O. Mustad & Son
 Johan Castberg (1862–1926) jurist and politician in Gjøvik 1890-1900
 Paul Olaf Bodding (1865–1938), missionary to India, monument at Gjøvik church
 Ole Evinrude (1877–1934) a Norwegian-American, invented the first practical outboard motor
 Niels Ødegaard (1892–1976) an educator, newspaper editor and politician 
 Harold Harby (1894–1978), City Council member, Los Angeles, California
 Arne Austeen DFC (1911–1945) a Norwegian flying ace, killed in WWII
 Ragnhild A. Lothe (born 1958) a microbiologist and cancer researcher
 Hans Olav Lahlum (born 1973) an historian, crime author, chess player and politician

The Arts 

 Finn Lange (1895–1976) a Norwegian actor 
 Georg Adelly (1919–1997) a Swedish film actor 
 Torbjørn Sunde (born 1954) a jazz trombonist and former speed-skater
 Kjell Ola Dahl (born 1958), author of Nordic noir crime novels
 Per A. Borglund (born 1961) a Norwegian newspaper and magazine editor
 Per Elvestuen (born 1962) a Norwegian illustrator.
 Mai Britt Normann (born 1966) a Norwegian singer-songwriter
 Eirik Hegdal (bornr 1973) a jazz saxophonist, composer & leader of Trondheim Jazz Orchestra
 Ali Pirzad-Amoli (born 1988) stage name A-Lee  pop singer-songwriter and rapper
 Anna Lotterud (born 1989) stage name Anna of the North, singer-songwriter
 Nora Foss al-Jabri (born 1996) singer, participant in the Norwegian 2012 Eurovision Song Contest

Sport 

 Guttorm Berge (1929–2004) an Alpine skier, bronze medalist at the 1952 Winter Olympics   
 Roger Aandalen (born 1965) a Norwegian boccia player, paralympic medallist
 Bente Nordby (born 1974) a former football goalkeeper, 172 caps with Norway women
 Else-Marthe Sørlie Lybekk (born 1978) a retired team handball player, Olympic medallist
 Gro Hammerseng (born 1980), handball player, captain of the Norwegian national team
 Ingvild Flugstad Østberg (born 1990) cross-country skier, silver and team gold medallist at the 2014 Winter Olympics
 Maren Lundby (born 1994) successful ski jumper, gold medallist at the 2018 Winter Olympics

Twin towns – sister cities

Gjøvik is twinned with:
 Gävle, Sweden
 Næstved, Denmark
 Rauma, Finland
 Stoughton, United States

Media gallery

References

External links

Municipal fact sheet from Statistics Norway 
Tourist information 
NTNU Gjøvik - University

 
Municipalities of Innlandet
1838 establishments in Norway